The Message Is Love is the self-produced tenth album by American R&B singer Barry White, released in October 1979.  It was White's first release on his own CBS-affiliated custom label, Unlimited Gold, following his departure from long-time label 20th Century-Fox Records, and advance interest was high. The album however proved a disappointment both critically and commercially. However, the album was still certified RIAA Gold. Two singles were released prior to the album's release, the first colliding with the release of White's previous album, I Love to Sing the Songs I Sing. 20th Century Fox, who had not release any singles off that album, decided to release two singles in the fall of 1979 to compete with White's new album release. Lacking an obvious hit single to provide sales impetus, The Message Is Love stalled outside the R&B top 10 (peaking at #14) and could only reach #67 on the pop chart. The poor performance of the album set the pattern for White's career slump in the early 1980s, which saw him fail to place any other album on the Billboard top 100 during the decade.

Track listing 
 Tracks written by Barry White and Paul Politi unless stated
 "It Ain't Love, Babe (Until You Give It)" - 4:22
 "Hung Up In Your Love" - 4:11
 "You're the One I Need" (Barry White, Smead Hudman) - 4:23
 "Any Fool Could See (You Were Meant for Me)" - 4:45
 "Love Ain't Easy" - 5:36
 "I'm on Fire" (Robert Jason) - 5:39
 "I Found Love" - 6:57

Singles

Certifications and sales

Barry White albums
1979 albums